Philastrius (also Philaster or Filaster) Bishop of Brescia, was one of the bishops present at a synod held in Aquileia in 381. Augustine of Hippo met him at Milan about 383, or perhaps a little later (St. Augustine, Ep. ccxxii). He composed a catalogue of heresies (Diversarum Hereseon Liber) about 384.  He died before 397. 

Among the writings of Gaudentius of Brescia was a sermon purporting to be preached on the fourteenth anniversary of Philastrius's death. According to this sermon, Philastrius's life began with a great act of renunciation, for which he might fitly be compared to Abraham. Later he was ordained priest, and travelled over nearly the whole Roman world (circumambiens Universum pene ambitum Romani Orbis), preaching against pagans, Jews, and heretics, especially the Arians. Like Paul of Tarsus he carried in his body the "stigmata" of Christ, having been scourged for his zeal against the last-named heretics. In Milan he was a great pillar of the Catholic party in the time of Ambrose's Arian predecessor. At Rome he held both private and public disputations with heretics, and converted many. His wanderings ceased when he was made Bishop of Brescia. 

Doubts were first raised by Louis Ellies du Pin as to the genuineness of this sermon, and these have been reiterated by Marx, the latest editor of Philastrius, who thinks the sermon a forgery of the eighth or ninth century. The chief objection to its genuineness, rather a weak one, seems to be that it is not found in the manuscripts containing the undoubted sermons of Gaudentius. Marx was answered by Knappe, "Ist die 21 Rede des hl. Gaudentius (Oratio B. Gaudentii de Vita et Obitu B. Filastrii episcopi prædecessoris sui) echt? Zugleich ein Betrag zur Latinität des Gaudentius" (Osnabrück), who endeavours to prove the genuineness of the sermon in question by linguistic arguments. His Bollandist reviewer thinks he has made a strong case (Anal. Boll., XXVIII, 224). 

Richard Adelbert Lipsius discovered that in Philastrius's "Catalogue" of heresies, for the Christian heresies up to Noetus, the compiler drew from the same source as Epiphanius of Salamis, i. e. the lost Syntagma of Hippolytus. By the aid, therefore, of these two and the Pseudo-Tertullian Adversus Omnes Haereses it has been possible in great measure to reconstruct the lost treatise of Hippolytus.

Philastrius' comments and spellings do not always accord with those of Epiphanius or Pseudo-Tertullian, for example his description of Nazaraei does not match well with either the Nasaraioi or Nazoraioi which Epiphanius attempts to distinguish.

References

Editions
The first edition of the "Catalogue" was published at Basle (1528)
F. Marx, Philastrius (Vienna, 1898) in the Corp. Script. Eccl. Lat.
Gabriele Banterle, translator, (1991, Rome) San Filastro di Brescia, Delle varie eresie / San Gaudenzio di Brescia, Trattati

External links
Opera Omnia by Migne Patrologia Latina

 Carla Setién (2017, Santiago de Compostela) “Herejes en el Antiguo Testamento según Filastrio de Brescia”, in (Re)escribindo a Historia. Achegas dos novos investigadores en Arqueoloxía e Ciencias da Antigüidade, Andavira, pp. 155–170.  
 Carla Setién (2018) “La transformación de la cultura clásica en el s. IV: el caso de Filastrio de Brescia”, SPhV 20, pp. 195–216.

Bishops of Brescia
Italian saints
Christian anti-Gnosticism
4th-century Italian bishops
390s deaths
4th-century Christian saints
Year of birth unknown